The Pittsfield Railroad Station is a historic former railroad station at 114 Central Street in Pittsfield, Maine. The station was built in 1888 by the Maine Central Railroad, and now serves as the Depot House Museum, operated by the Pittsfield Historical Society.  It is one of the best-preserved railroad stations in Maine from that time period.  The building was listed on the National Register of Historic Places on January 23, 1980.

Description and history
The Pittsfield depot is set on the north side of the railroad tracks that run east–west on the southern outskirts of the town center.  The building is a single-story wood frame structure, with clapboard siding.  Its main facade faces toward the tracks to the south, and is nine bays wide, with a succession of windows and doorways, and a rectangular projection.  The building has a hip roof, with a gable at the center of the main facade, and extended eaves with Stick style brackets and a paneled entablature.  The building has retained all of its original windows, which are distinguished by patterned colored glass in the upper sashes.

The first railroad to arrive in Pittsfield was the Maine Central Railroad in 1855, providing service to Bangor and Waterville.  In 1886 the Sebasticook and Moosehead Railroad built a spur line from Pittsfield to Hartland, significantly increasing the activity level at the station.  The Maine Central built this station in 1888.  There was originally an exchange house located at the west end of the station, to facilitate the transfer of goods from one line to the other; this has since been demolished.

The station is now owned by the town, and operated by the Pittsfield Historical Society as a museum.

See also
National Register of Historic Places listings in Somerset County, Maine

References

External links

Pittsfield Historical Society web site

Maine Central Railroad stations
Queen Anne architecture in Maine
Italianate architecture in Maine
Railway stations in the United States opened in 1888
Railway stations on the National Register of Historic Places in Maine
Pittsfield, Maine
Transportation buildings and structures in Somerset County, Maine
Museums in Somerset County, Maine
Railroad museums in Maine
National Register of Historic Places in Somerset County, Maine
Former railway stations in Maine